Hyderabad Football Club Reserves and Academy are the reserve team and youth academy system of Indian Super League club Hyderabad. They competes in the RF Development League.

History
On 10 January 2020, it was announced that Indian Super League club Hyderabad would field a reserve team in the upcoming 2019–20 I-League 2nd Division. The team was placed in Group B alongside Mohammedan, Bhawanipore, Chennaiyin Reserves, and Bengaluru B. They played their first match of the league on 6 February 2020 against Chennaiyin Reserves and won 3–1.

On 20 August 2020, it was announced  Hyderabad signed Thangboi Sinto and Shameel Chembakath  as their technical director and reserve team head coach respectively.

Squad

References

External links
 Hyderabad Reserves at the AIFF official website

Hyderabad FC Reserves and Academy
Indian reserve football teams
2020 establishments in Telangana
I-League 2nd Division clubs
Football academies in India